Nebojša Đorđević (born 21 May 1945) is a Serbian former footballer who played as a goalkeeper.

Career
After playing for Voždovački in the Yugoslav Second League, Đorđević spent five seasons with OFK Beograd between 1968 and 1973, making 92 appearances in the Yugoslav First League.

In 1973, Đorđević moved abroad to Spain and signed with Segunda División club Sabadell. He later returned to OFK Beograd to finish his career.

References

External links
 
 

1945 births
Living people
Footballers from Belgrade
Yugoslav footballers
Serbian footballers
Association football goalkeepers
FK Voždovac players
OFK Beograd players
CE Sabadell FC footballers
Yugoslav Second League players
Yugoslav First League players
Segunda División players
Yugoslav expatriate footballers
Expatriate footballers in Spain
Yugoslav expatriate sportspeople in Spain